The wedding dress of Princess Mary (only daughter of King George V of the United Kingdom) was worn at her wedding to Henry Lascelles, Viscount Lascelles, on 28 February 1922 at Westminster Abbey.

The dress was designed by Messrs. Reville, Ltd. The dress was constructed of cloth of silver, with an ivory silk train. Instead of wearing a tiara, Mary wore a floral headdress. In terms of jewellery, Mary wore a diamond and pearl brooch, a gift from the bridegroom; on her bodice she wore the brooch given to her by the Royal Scots.

The "newly-conserved train of Princess Mary’s wedding dress, embroidered with emblematic flowers of the British Empire, alongside her bridal slippers and a floral headdress" are to be on exhibition at Harewood House, the seat of the Earls of Harewood,  beginning in September 2019.

See also
 List of individual dresses

References

External links
Order of Service for the wedding

British royal attire
Mary
1920s fashion